Anthony or Tony Piccolo may refer to:

 Anthony Piccolo (seaQuest DSV), a character on the American TV series seaQuest DSV
 Tony Piccolo (born 1960), Australian politician